Reeshafiq bin Alwi (born 12 December 1982) is a Malaysian professional footballer currently playing for PJ Rangers FC.

Career
Reeshafiq began his football career with University of Malaya football team in the Malaysian Inter-varsity League. In year 2005 he made into the senior squad of Kuala Lumpur FA and with the team until 2007.

In 2008 the former skipper of Kuala Lumpur FA has moved to PLUS FC and performed with the team until 2010.

Later Reeshafiq had leaves PLUS FC and joined Terengganu FA for 2011 season. In July 2011, Reeshafiq had won the Malaysian FA Cup for the first time with Terengganu FA after defeating Kelantan FA.

He played with Sarawak FA in 2014.

Reeshafiq also has represented the Malaysia at the 2004 ASEAN University Games in Surabaya, Indonesia and had won the bronze medal. Later he represented Malaysia to the 2007 World University Games or known as Universiade at Bangkok, Thailand. He is also a silver medalist at the 2008 ASEAN University Games held in Kuala Lumpur after being defeated by the team from Thailand.

Honours
Melaka United
 Malaysia Premier League:2016

References

1982 births
Living people
Malaysian footballers
Melaka United F.C. players
Kuala Lumpur City F.C. players
Terengganu FC players
People from Kuching
People from Sarawak
Malaysian people of Malay descent
Association football midfielders